George Maldon Welsh (3 October 1896 – 16 September 1983) was an Australian rules footballer who played with Fitzroy in the Victorian Football League (VFL).

Notes

External links 

1896 births
1983 deaths
Australian rules footballers from Victoria (Australia)
Fitzroy Football Club players
Australian military personnel of World War I